Hunter Haley King (born Haley Ashley King) is an American actress. She is known for portraying Adriana Masters on Hollywood Heights (2012), Summer Newman on The Young and the Restless (2012–2016, 2018–2022) and Clementine Hughes on Life in Pieces (2015–2019). Earlier in her career she was credited as Haley King, but she has since been credited as Hunter King.

Personal life
She has an older sister named Kelli and a younger sister, Joey King. At a young age, King acted in a theater in Agoura Hills, California. Her sister Joey has said, "I'm part Jewish and part Christian, but I'm mostly Jewish." In August 2018, King became engaged to her boyfriend of two years, Nico Svoboda.  They called off their engagement in 2020.

Career
King began her professional acting career by guest-starring in series such as Roswell,  Hannah Montana and Workaholics. She starred as Adriana Masters in the Nick at Nite drama Hollywood Heights. It was there that she met The Young and the Restless executive producer Jill Farren-Phelps. "Jill brought me over there. I never auditioned for Y&R. As I was coming off the plane from Florida with a friend, Jill called and said, 'Do you want to come work on Y&R and play Summer?' I was like, 'Yeah.' She said, 'Okay. You start in two days.'"

On October 15, 2012, she made her debut on the CBS Daytime soap opera as Summer Newman, replacing Lindsay Bushman. King's performance in the role earned her a nomination for the Young Artist Award for Best Performance in a Daytime TV Series - Young Actress, losing out to her Y&R predecessor Samantha Bailey. King was also nominated for the Daytime Emmy Award for Outstanding Younger Actress in a Drama Series in 2013, losing out to Kristen Alderson before winning the following year, beating out Alderson, Linsey Godfrey, Kim Matula and Kelly Missal.

In 2013, it was reported that King accused her Y&R co-star Michael Muhney of allegedly groping her. Radar Online reported that King complained that Muhney fondled her breasts on two occasions, both of which were unsolicited and unwanted advances. According to Radar Online, King told producers she would go to the police and file a report against Muhney if he was not fired from the show. Muhney was fired on December 17, 2013, claiming that the allegations were false and merely a salacious rumor. No charges were ever filed.

King appeared as a guest model on two episodes of The Price Is Right during "Dream Car Week" in November 2013 and again for two more episodes in October 2014.

In 2015, King was cast in A Girl Like Her (originally named The Bully Chronicles) as Avery Keller, and was cast on the CBS comedy series Life in Pieces as Clementine. Initially a recurring role in season one, she was promoted to series regular for second season, leaving The Young and the Restless as regular cast member. In May 2018, TVLine announced that King would come back to The Young and the Restless as Summer as a contract cast member starting June 4, 2018. King was able to work on both her shows because an understudy took over her role as Summer for several episodes.

Filmography

Awards and nominations

References

External links
 
 
 

1993 births
Living people
21st-century American actresses
American child actresses
American film actresses
Jewish American actresses
American people of Italian descent
Place of birth missing (living people)
American soap opera actresses
American television actresses
American video game actresses
Daytime Emmy Award winners
Daytime Emmy Award for Outstanding Younger Actress in a Drama Series winners
21st-century American Jews